Pacific American Airlines was a United States charter airline headquartered in Burbank, California. Its predecessor was formed in 1946 as Airplane Charter by Mercer and renamed to Mercer Airlines in 1955. DeWight W. Mercer sold the company, was renamed Pacific American in 1976. The airline provided interstate passenger and cargo charter services as well as contract services for the United States Navy in the Pacific area. It has since ceased operations.


Fleet
 4 – Douglas DC-6
 1 – Lockheed L-188 Electra

Accidents and incidents
 On August 4, 1972, a Mercer Airlines Douglas DC-3, registration N31538, suffered an in-flight engine fire shortly after takeoff from Naval Air Station Point Mugu on a repositioning flight to Hollywood-Burbank Airport. The aircraft departed the runway in the emergency landing and was severely damaged by the subsequent fire. All three people on board survived.
 On February 8, 1976, Mercer Airlines Flight 901 (prototype of the DC-6 series), registration N901MA, experienced the separation of its no. 3 engine shortly after takeoff from Hollywood-Burbank Airport. One of engine's propeller blades passed through the fuselage and severed pneumatic, hydraulic, and emergency airbrake lines as well as the electrical wiring for Curtiss electric propeller controls and some engine instruments. The blade continued out of the fuselage and struck the no. 2 engine, disabling its lube oil scavenge pump and causing it to begin filling with oil.  After an abortive attempt to land at Burbank, which became a touch-and-go when the crew discovered that hydraulic brakes, thrust reverse, and emergency air brakes were all inoperative, the captain elected to attempt an emergency landing on the longer, uphill Runway 34L at Van Nuys.  Because of severe damage resulting in loss of power from the No. 2 engine, a bare firewall where the No. 3 engine had separated, and drag from the drooping landing gear and flaps, the airplane was unable to make it to the runway and attempted to land on a golf course in the final approach corridor.  The nose of the aircraft struck a  concrete foundation of a partially constructed building, separating the nose gear main trunnion and jamming the gear assembly up into the cockpit. The three flight crew members aboard the aircraft perished, although the two stewardesses and a baggage handler in the cabin survived.

See also 
 List of defunct airlines of the United States

References

Airlines established in 1946
Defunct airlines of the United States
Defunct companies based in California
1946 establishments in California
Airlines based in California